William Coffey VC DCM (5 August 1829 – 13 July 1875), born in Knocklong, County Limerick, was an Irish recipient of the Victoria Cross, the highest and most prestigious award for gallantry in the face of the enemy that can be awarded to British and Commonwealth forces.

Details
He was 25 years old, and a private in the 34th Regiment (later The Border Regiment), British Army during the Crimean War when the following deed took place for which he was awarded the VC.

On 29 March 1855 at Sebastopol, the Crimea, Private Coffey threw a live shell, which had fallen into a trench, over the parapet and thus saved many lives.

Further information

Coffey was posted to Indian fighting in the Indian Mutiny. He achieved the rank of sergeant. It was reported that he died by suicide (shot himself) in the Army drill shed Sheffield, 13 July 1875.  However his death certificate shows he died of dysentery at Stonegravels, Chesterfield. He was buried in Spital cemetery, Chesterfield.  Originally he was buried in an unmarked, common plot but in 1970 a stone, provided by the Border Regiment, was put on his grave following a service.

The medal
His Victoria Cross is displayed at Cumbria's Museum of Military Life Carlisle Castle, Cumbria, England.

References

Listed in order of publication year 
The Register of the Victoria Cross (1981, 1988 and 1997)

Ireland's VCs (Dept of Economic Development, 1995)
Monuments to Courage (David Harvey, 1999)
Irish Winners of the Victoria Cross (Richard Doherty & David Truesdale, 2000)

External links
Location of grave and VC medal (Derbyshire)
The Story of Sergeant William Coffey VC DCM

Irish recipients of the Victoria Cross
Crimean War recipients of the Victoria Cross
British Army personnel of the Crimean War
British military personnel of the Indian Rebellion of 1857
Recipients of the Distinguished Conduct Medal
Border Regiment soldiers
Military personnel from County Limerick
1829 births
1875 deaths
19th-century Irish people
Irish soldiers in the British Army
British Army recipients of the Victoria Cross